Workforce Advantage Academy is a charter school in Orange County, Florida serving 11th and 12th graders with an academic and business internship program. Denis Tillman is the school's director of business development.

References

Schools in Orange County, Florida